Joseph David Beglar, or Joseph David Freedone Melik Beglar (1845–1907), was an Indian engineer, archaeologist and photographer working in British-India and reporting to the Archaeological Survey of India, known for his images of temples and religious art. He was an assistant of Alexander Cunningham.

Works
Report of a Tour through the Bengal Provinces (1878)
Report of Tours in the South-eastern Provinces in 1874-75 and 1875-76 Google Books
Report of a Tour in Bundelkhand and Malwa, 1871-72: And in the Central Provinces, 1873-74 
Report for the Year 1871-72- Delhi and Agra

References

1845 births
1907 deaths
Archaeological Survey of India people
Indian people of Armenian descent
19th-century archaeologists